The Hvidovre Mixed Doubles Cup is an annual mixed doubles curling tournament on the ISS Mixed Doubles World Curling Tour. It is held annually in February at the Hvidovre Curling Club in Hvidovre, Denmark.

The purse for the event is €2,500 with the winning team receiving €1,050 and its event categorization is 100 (highest calibre is 1000).

The event has been held since 2018. It became a World Curling Tour event in 2020.

Past champions

References

World Curling Tour events
Curling competitions in Denmark
Hvidovre Municipality
Mixed doubles curling